Sandégué Department is a department of Gontougo Region in Zanzan District, Ivory Coast. In 2021, its population was 69,742 and its seat is the settlement of Sandégué. The sub-prefectures of the department are Bandakagni-Tomora, Dimandougou, Sandégué, and Yorobodi.

History
Sandégué Department was created in 2009 as a second-level subdivision via a split-off from Bondoukou Department. At its creation, it was part of Zanzan Region.

In 2011, districts were introduced as new first-level subdivisions of Ivory Coast. At the same time, regions were reorganised and became second-level subdivisions and all departments were converted into third-level subdivisions. At this time, Sandégué Department became part of Gontougo Region in Zanzan District.

Notes

Departments of Gontougo
States and territories established in 2009
2009 establishments in Ivory Coast